Al-Qasimiyah also spelled Qasemiyeh, is a Syrian village located in Markaz Rif Dimashq, Rif Dimashq to the east of the Al-Nashabiyah nahiyah ("subdistrict"). According to the Syria Central Bureau of Statistics (CBS), Al-Qasimiyah had a population of 3,518 in the 2004 census.

References 

Populated places in Markaz Rif Dimashq District